Dropmyemail is a cloud-based e-mail backup software offered by Dropmysite that offers cloud storage and  Online backup software. It allows users to automatically backup their e-mails to the cloud with an option to view, migrate or restore them whenever required via a web browser.

Overview 
Dropmyemail's concept was conceived by founder John Fearon. The site was launched on 1 March 2012 at Demo Asia, a launchpad for emerging technology in Singapore. The site had received seed funding of $290,000, with more undisclosed amounts following in 2013.

, Dropmyemail had more than 525,000 users.

Dropmyemail's backend is written in Ruby on Rails and is hosted on the Amazon Web Services Cloud Infrastructure. Most of the e-mail platforms such as Gmail, Hotmail and Yahoo are supported by Dropmyemail. Users can also backup their e-mail via IMAP or POP settings.

Dropmyemail uses Amazon's S3 storage system to store the files.

Business model 
On November 21, 2012, Dropmyemail launched its business offering for SoHO and SMB with a per e-mail mailbox price plans. Dropmyemail moved away from a Freemium business model to a 15-day Free Trial-based business model.

The company launched its affiliate program on December 13, 2012, to meet the demands of various websites to resell Dropmyemail's service.

References

External links 
 
 Venture Beat: E-mail backup service DropMyEmail.com grabs over 500K users in just 2 months (posted April 19, 2012)

Cloud applications
Email attachment replacements
File hosting
File sharing services
Online backup services
Internet properties established in 2012